The Potawatomi (also known as Pottawatomie) are a group of Native American people, see Potawatomi Indians. It may also refer to

Locations
Pottawatomie County
 Pottawattamie County, Iowa
 Pottawatomie County, Kansas
 Pottawatomie County, Oklahoma
Pottawatomie Township, Coffey County, Kansas
Pottawattamie Park, Indiana, a town
Pottawatomie Light, a lighthouse in Wisconsin

Events
Pottawatomie Trail of Death (1838), the forced removal of Potawatomi Indians
Pottawatomie Massacre (1856), during Bleeding Kansas
Pottawatomie Rifles, an abolitionist militia